Schoolgirl Diary is a 1941 Italian "white-telephones" drama film directed by Mario Mattoli and starring Alida Valli.

Cast
 Alida Valli as Anna Campolmi
 Irasema Dilián as Maria Rovani (as Irasema Dilian)
 Andrea Checchi as Il professore Marini
 Giuditta Rissone as La direttrice del collegio
 Ada Dondini as La signorina Elgsorina Mattei
 Carlo Campanini as Campanelli, il bidello
 Olga Solbelli as La signorina Bottelli
 Sandro Ruffini as Carlo Palmieri, padre di Maria
 Bianca Della Corte as Luisa
 Dedi Montano as L'insegnate di musica

References

External links

1941 films
1941 drama films
Italian drama films
1940s Italian-language films
Italian black-and-white films
Films directed by Mario Mattoli
1940s Italian films